Nedžad Bajrović (born 4 July 1970 in Gusinje, Montenegro) is a Bosnian retired football player.

Playing career

Club
He formed a central defensive duo with Samir Kuduzović at Sloboda Tuzla for several years and they met again in 2019 when they were both managing lower league sides.

International
Bajrović made his debut for Bosnia and Herzegovina in a November 1997 friendly match away against Tunisia and has earned a total of 4 caps, scoring no goals. His final international was a March 2000 friendly against Jordan.

Managerial career
In September 2012, he succeeded Boris Gavran, who only was a few days at the helm, as temporary coach of Gradina. He was appointed manager of third tier Bosna Mionica in July 2019.
He was coach of Gradina's women's team in 2020.

References

External links

Profile - NFSBIH

1970 births
Living people
People from Gusinje
Association football midfielders
Bosnia and Herzegovina footballers
Bosnia and Herzegovina international footballers
FK Sloboda Tuzla players
Al-Merrikh SC players
Premier League of Bosnia and Herzegovina players
Sudan Premier League players
Bosnia and Herzegovina expatriate footballers
Expatriate footballers in Sudan
Bosnia and Herzegovina football managers